Dahira tridens is a moth of the  family Sphingidae. It is known from Nepal.

References

Dahira
Moths described in 1904